The name Mujigae was used for two tropical cyclones in the northwestern Pacific Ocean. The name was contributed by North Korea. It replaced "Maemi" after the 2003 typhoon season. 

 Tropical Storm Mujigae (2009) (T0913, 14W, Maring) – made landfall on Hainan Island and then on Vietnam.
 Typhoon Mujigae (2015) (T1522, 22W, Kabayan) – a destructive Category 4 typhoon that formed just east of the Philippines and made landfall in Guangdong, China
 
The name "Mujigae" was retired by the ESCAP/WMO Typhoon Committee in 2016 and replaced with "Surigae" for the 2021 typhoon season.

Pacific typhoon set index articles